The Merchants of Souls is a 2001 science fiction novel by John Barnes and the third book in the Thousand Cultures series.

Summary
The book follows Giraut Leones, a special agent who has been betrayed by those he thought he could trust. He has sworn off of working for the Office of Special Projects but is drawn back after discovering that a group has begun recording the personalities of the deceased and is using them for their own entertainment. This is considered an affront to Leones and many of the peoples of the Thousand Cultures, threatening to break the fragile balance in place.

Characters
 Giraut Leones - An experienced agent and musician from Nou Occitan who was brought back from leave to address a new threat to personal liberties.
 Raimbaut Bovalhor - A long-dead friend of Giraut, whose psypyx is installed in Giraut's brain as a witness against commercialization of psypyxes.
 Laprada Prieczka - A young new female OSP agent, a member of the Council of Humanity, granddaughter of celebrated OSP hero Lohemo Prieczko; love interest to Raimbaut.
 Dji - elder OSP supervisor to Giraut, Laprada, Piranesi, and Paxa; one of "Kiel's Boys," graduate of OSP Class Four along with Shan, Lohemo Prieczko and Sir Qrala.
 Shan - elder OSP supervisor and friend to Giraut, Margaret, Qrala, Paxa, Piranesi, and other OSP agents.
 Piranesi Alcott & Paxa Prytanis - Military husband and artistic wife; both are OSP agents from Hedon, the so-called "Pleasure Culture."
 Margaret - Giraut's ex-wife from Caledony, the culture where they met and fell in love, and then both chose to join the OSP.
 Sir Qrala - an elder experienced OSP agent; estranged friend of Shan and Dji from their days as "Kiel's Boys."

Planets referenced
 Earth — the home planet of humanity in the Inner Sphere; the Sol System with its local colonized planets and their satellites, both natural and artificial; also the colonies of Alpha Centauri and other neighboring star systems.
 Söderblom (home to the rationalistic pleasure-seeking culture of Hedonia, where Giraut goes on vacation, and also of Freiporto, an anarcho-criminal culture where, until recently, an extreme version of Social Darwinism was the only law and slavery its currency).
 Nansen (Margaret's home planet; two cultures, Caledony and St. Michael, share the planet peacefully).
 Wilson (Giraut's home planet) - one of the few colony planets that had a single human culture seeded (Nou Occitan) because of its unusual orbit around Arcturus, and its scarcity of land (according to the rules of the Charter).
 Briand (a high-gravity planet orbiting Metallah, a very bright star, where two human literary cultures were seeded, clashed, and eventually destroyed each other); described in "Earth Made of Glass".

Reception
Critical reception for The Merchants of Souls was mixed, with the Orlando Sentinel giving it a positive review while Publishers Weekly panned the novel. Kirkus Reviews also gave a mixed review, stating that it was a "Soporifically plotted story of ideas that, despite some sly social satire, gets lost in interminable talk about human identity, truth, and memory." In contrast, Locus Online named it one of their recommended reads of 2001 for science fiction novels and nominated it for a 2002 Locus Award.

See also

 Interstellar teleporter
 Tunnel in the Sky
 Gridlinked

References

External links 
 

2001 American novels
2001 science fiction novels
American science fiction novels
Novels by John Barnes
Tor Books books